McCone is a surname. Notable people with the surname include:

John A. McCone (1902–1991), American businessman, politician and CIA director from 1961 to 1965
Ryan McCone (born 1987), New Zealand cricketer

Fictional characters:
Alexander Hamilton McCone, fictional character of Kurt Vonnegut's Jailbird
Daniel McCone, fictional millionaire of Kurt Vonnegut's Jailbird, father of Alexander Hamilton McCone
Evan McCone, fictional character of Richard Bachman's The Running Man
Gina McCone, fictional character of Stephen King's The Stand
Sharon McCone, fictional detective created by Marcia Muller

Other 
McCone County, Montana, named in honor of State Senator George McCone.

See also 
McCown
McCowen
McCune (surname)
McEwan
McEwen
McKeon
McKeown
McKone